Mir Nawaz Khan Marwat is a well known elderly lawyer of Sindh High Court.

Biography 

Mir Nawaz Khan Marwat has participated in global peace movements for the last 20 years and has presented several papers on bridging the gap between different civilizations. He was a Federal Minister in the civilian cabinet of President of Pakistan General Muhammad Zia-ul-Haq. At present he is actively associated with Motamar Al Alam Al Islami as its Assistant Secretary General and has attended numerous Peace Conferences all over the globe. Mir Nawaz Khan is a polyglot and can speak English, French, Arabic, Spanish and almost all the regional languages of Pakistan.
Mirnawaz khan marwat is an active member of JUI-F

See also
 Bannu

References 

Living people
Pakistani lawyers
Pashtun people
Year of birth missing (living people)